Conrad Friberg (1896-1989) was an American filmmaker, labor organizer and wallpaper hanger in Chicago, Illinois. Many of his films are credited to "C.O. Nelson". His best known work is Halsted Street, which he produced when a member and lead organizer in the Chicago Workers' Film & Photo League.

Friberg was born in 1896 in Chicago, Illinois to John Friberg and Anna Marie Nelson, both immigrants from Sweden.  He attended the Copernicus School in Chicago until the 8th grade, leaving school before attending high school.

During World War I, Friberg began using his mother’s maiden name and moved from Chicago to New Orleans to avoid the draft.  He became known as “Con” or C.O. Nelson.  After operating a street car in New Orleans, he worked his way west to California, where he worked at a logging camp in Feather River Canyon, visited Mount Lassen, and traveled on a mail stage coach, photographing with a “post card” camera along the way.

Friberg's brother, musician James Friberg, was interviewed before the Special Committee on Victor L. Berger Investigation in 1919 regarding his activities in the Young People's Socialist League and interactions with William F. Kruse. In these hearings, it was also mentioned that Conrad Friberg had run the Young Socialist camp Yipsel at Fox Lake the previous year.

After the war, Friberg continued to use the name C.O. Nelson for his political film and photography work, as well as some articles in leftist publications.  In the 1920s, he worked for the Federated Press, providing photographs for labor publications.

Friberg was associated with labor organizing through his work as president of the Chicago office workers union. In the late 1930s, he worked for an insurance company in Chicago.  His wife, Mildred, worked at the Vilnus Lithuanian Daily paper for many years.  He had one son, Carl.

Films

 National Hunger March (contributor)
 Halsted Street
 The Farm
 Our Relations
 Swedish Cooperatives
 Mexican Earth
 Chicago Winter
 The Way it Was in San Francisco

References
Citations

Bibliography
Campbell, Russell and Alexander, William. Film and Photo League Filmography, Jump Cut, no. 14, 1977, p. 33 
Campbell, Russell. Film and Photo League: Radical cinema in the 30s. Jump Cut: A Review of Contemporary Media, no. 14, 1977, pp. 23–25. Retrieved August 24, 2006.
Campbell, Russell. Cinema Strikes Back: Radical Filmmaking in the United States 1930-1942. Ann Arbor: UMI Research Press, 1982
Brandon, Tom. Survival List: Films of the Great Depression in Platt, David, ed. Celluloid Power: Social Film Criticism from The Birth of a Nation to Judgment at Nuremberg, Metuchen, N.J: Scarecrow Press, 1992.
Tom Gunning. One-Way Street: Urban Chronotopes in Ruttman's Berlin: Symphony of a Great City and Conrad's Halsted Street. p 62. 
Daniel Frontino Elash. Exploring New Sources on the Workers Film and Photo League, in Overcoming Silence, 9 June 2010 

American experimental filmmakers
American photojournalists
1896 births
1989 deaths
Social documentary photographers